Ivan Jovanović (born 28 February 1990) is a Serbian football midfielder who plays for Dolina Padina.

References

External links
 
 Ivan Jovanović stats at utakmica.rs

1990 births
Living people
Sportspeople from Požarevac
Association football midfielders
Serbian footballers
FK Teleoptik players
FK Jagodina players
FK Mladi Radnik players
FK Radnički Sombor players
FK Železnik players
Serbian SuperLiga players